List of cities, towns, settlements, and villages in Trinidad and Tobago:

Largest

A

B

C

D

E

F

G

H

I

J

K

L

M

N

O

P

Q

R

S

T

U

V

W

References

 
Trinidad and Tobago
Cities